The Townsville Crocodiles were an Australian professional men's basketball team based in the North Queensland city of Townsville. They competed in the National Basketball League (NBL) and played their home games at the Townsville Entertainment and Convention Centre. Between their inception in 1993 and their final season in 2015–16, the Crocodiles enjoyed financial stability and sustained community support, but on-court success eluded them.

Team history

1986–1992: Gaining admission into the NBL 
Former Brisbane Bullets guard Mark Bragg, a Townsville resident, began campaigning to bring an NBL franchise to Townsville in the late 1980s. The franchise adopted the name of Townsville's State League team, becoming the Townsville Suns. The NBL was ready to admit the Suns, along with fellow Queenslanders the Gold Coast Cougars, in 1990, but financial backing for the Suns' venue fell through.

Local government then got behind Bragg's bid, and the Townsville Entertainment and Convention Centre was completed in time for the Suns' debut in February 1993.

1993–1998: Early years 
With Bragg at the helm as head coach, the Suns struggled during their debut season, but it only took five games before they recorded their first-ever NBL win, a victory over the Newcastle Falcons. Townsville broke the mould in 1993, becoming the first Australian team to hire an 'import' player from a country other than the United States; Lithuanian player Rimas Kurtinaitis was a crucial part of the team during their debut season. The Suns finished 4–22 and took the wooden spoon.

Townsville would not reach the playoffs in its first six seasons, although they came perilously close in the 1997 season; needing only one win from their final six games to ensure a historic playoff appearance, the Suns went 0–6 after centre Clarence Tyson suffered a season-ending knee injury in Canberra. After a disappointing 1998 campaign, Mark Bragg was sacked as head coach. With 151 games played out of the Suns' 164, Jason Cameron was the only player to have played in all six Suns seasons.

Throughout, Townsville fans stuck by the team, ensuring the club set an Australian record for attendances; the Suns sold out their first 69 games at the "Furnace" (capacity 4,141), a streak that was only broken after the venue was expanded for the 1998 season.

1998–2001: Name change and finals basketball 
It was a very different team that took the court in the 1998/99 season. The team had been involved in a dispute with the NBA's Phoenix Suns, who held the "Suns" trademark in Australia. Faced with the prospect of paying Phoenix royalties on merchandise sales, the team changed its name to the Townsville Crocodiles. New head coach Ian Stacker took the reins, and immediately attracted top-name talent like Australian Olympic player Sam Mackinnon, but it would take one more season before Townsville's long-suffering fans saw playoff basketball.

The Crocodiles finished second in the NBL in 1999/2000 with a 22–6 record, meaning they got a first-round bye in the NBL playoffs. But they faced a battle-hardened Perth Wildcats team in the semi-finals, and were defeated 2–1 in front of their disappointed home fans. Perth would go on to win the championship.

The Crocs again went 22–6 the following year and, under the league's new playoff system, eliminated both the Sydney Kings and the Victoria Titans. It came down to the grand final series, where the team lost 2 games to 1- 95–92 in the final game- after a thrilling fourth-quarter comeback by the Wollongong Hawks.

2002–2006: Missed opportunities 
Townsville missed the playoffs in 2002 and the 2003 season looked no better, but the Crocodiles strung together a 16-game winning streak to again finish second on the NBL ladder. (The streak equaled an NBL record.) Townsville lost the opening-round series 2–1 to Wollongong, but by virtue of NBL rules, got a second chance to advance; they were then finally eliminated by the eventual champion Sydney Kings.

After another disappointing season in 2005–06, Townsville head coach Ian Stacker's contract was not renewed. The Crocodiles again failed to make the playoffs.

Trevor Gleeson was appointed coach and the team improved on their failed 2005–06 season by making the play-offs. They won their first final against one of the newcomers in the Singapore Slingers but lost their second to the Sydney Kings.

2006–2009: Return to finals 
2007–08 saw the Crocs struggle in their first ten games, only winning three matches.  Before the season, the team was struggling with injuries to both 7-foot centre's Ben Pepper (back) and Greg Vanderjagt (knee) along with swingman Bradley Sheridan (back).  The team ended up losing newly signed import Rosell Ellis who suffered a freak of an injury when he tore his pectoral muscle during a weight session just after two matches.  In those two matches saw Ellis get 27 points and 11 rebounds in both matches.  The Crocs then brought in streetball legend Corey 'Homicide' Wiliams which saw the Crocs turn back into a strong team.  With also help from the crocs bench saw them finish the season in fifth place with a record of 17–13.  But just like the 2006–07 season, saw the crocs win their first game against another newcomer Gold Coast Blaze but were once again saw them smashed by the team who finished one win higher than the Crocs in the Perth Wildcats 96–78.

The crocs have now made a push to make it to the top four in the 2008–09 season when they re-signed imports Williams and Ellis and also signings Brad Williamson and Steven Broom from the Brisbane Bullets and former Boomer Russell Hinder.

The 2008/09 season saw them struggle to have a full roster with Bradley Sheridan (ankles), Ben Pepper (personal reasons) and Steven Broom (shoulder) leaving the club before the season had even began.  The local fans were able to rally behind the club to finish 5th.  The Crocs were unable to make the grand final series as they were knocked out by eventual champions South Dragons.

2013–2016: Financial troubles and disbandment 
On 8 April 2013, the Crocodiles announced that Barrier Reef Basketball Pty Ltd was relinquishing its National Basketball League license, putting the Crocodiles' 2013–14 season in doubt. In September 2013, the Crocodiles re-entered the league as a community owned club under head coach, Shawn Dennis.

In June 2014, the Crocodiles announced that the Townsville RSL Stadium would be their new home court for the 2014–15 season. Following the 2014–15 season, the Crocodiles decided to place themselves into Voluntary Administration. On 21 May 2015, they re-entered the league for a second time after regaining control of the Deed of Company Arrangement and subsequently received NBL approval to re-enter the competition. The Crocodiles also announced that they would be returning to the Townsville Entertainment and Convention Centre for the 2015–16 season. In February 2016, the Queensland Police seized a compressed air launcher use by the team for over ten years to launch folded T-shirts into the crowd, after the device was deemed to be a category B weapon.

On 14 April 2016, the Crocodiles pulled out of the 2016–17 season due to financial pressures.

Retired Jerseys 
 #7 David Blades
 #21 Robert Rose

Honour roll

Season by season

Kevin Sugars Medal (Club MVP) 
1993 Ricky Jones
1994 Darryl Johnson
1995 Derek Rucker
1996 Clarence Tyson
1997 Derek Rucker
1998 Derek Rucker
1999 Robert Rose
2000 Sam Mackinnon & Robert Rose
2001 Robert Rose
2002 Robert Rose
2003 Pat Reidy & Wayne Turner
2004 Pat Reidy
2005 John Rillie
2006 Larry Abney
2007 Larry Abney & John Rillie
2008 John Rillie
2009 Corey Williams
2010 Corey Williams
2011 Luke Schenscher
2012 Peter Crawford
2013 Gary Ervin
2014 Brian Conklin
2015 Brian Conklin
2016 Jordair Jett

Source: Award Winners

Notable players 
  Larry Abney
  Will Blalock
  Jason Cameron
  Chris Cedar
  Brian Conklin
  Peter Crawford
  Gary Ervin
  Wayne Turner
  Russell Hinder
  Rimas Kurtinaitis
  Luke Nevill
  Josh Pace
  Robert Rose
  /  Derek Rucker
  Luke Schenscher
  /  Corey Williams

References

External links 
 National Basketball League official website
 Townsville Crocodiles official website

 
Defunct National Basketball League (Australia) teams
Sport in Townsville
Basketball teams in Queensland
Basketball teams established in 1993
Basketball teams disestablished in 2016